Lift Our Voices is an American nonprofit organization led by journalist and television host Gretchen Carlson and political consultant Julie Roginsky, who co-founded it in 2019, after their respective experiences of alleged sexual harassment while working at Fox News. Founded after the start of the MeToo movement, its mission is to end legal mechanisms that prevent survivors of Sexual assault, harassment, and other workplace abuse from speaking out publicly, such as Non-disclosure agreement and forced arbitration.

In 2022, co-founder Carlson played a significant role in working with members of Congress to pass the Ending Forced Arbitration of Sexual Assault and Sexual Harassment Act, which was signed into law by President Joe Biden in March 2022. Five years after the start of the MeToo movement, the law was singled out as one of the legislative changes to prevent workplace harassment.

Founders and background 
Lift Our Voices was founded in 2019 by Carlson, Roginsky, and journalist Diana Falzone in the aftermath of lawsuits by both Carlson and Roginsky against Roger Ailes and Fox News. Both suits were settled, and the women were obligated to sign non-disclosure agreements as part of their agreements. After Carlson’s experience, she was named one of Time Magazine's Time 100 list of the most influential people in 2017, with the essay on Carlson written by journalist Katie Couric. In 2019, the film Bombshell told the story of Carlson's experience at Fox, but due to her stringent non-disclosure agreement she was prevented from speaking about her experience with the filmmakers or actress Nicole Kidman, who portrayed Carlson. Her story and Ailes’s removal from Fox News after the allegations was documented in the Showtime miniseries The Loudest Voice, based on journalist Gabriel Sherman's book The Loudest Voice in the Room and with Carlson portrayed by Naomi Watts. Sherman also wrote about Carlson's experience in New York Magazine.

Roginsky, a Democratic political consultant who was a contributor at Fox, said that she had difficulties finding other opportunities as a contributor or television host after her lawsuit against Fox News, with an agent telling her that she did not want to be associated with someone who had sued a network. Roginsky alleged experiencing a toxic workplace environment while consulting for New Jersey Democratic gubernatorial candidate Phil Murphy in 2017.

Mission and work 
In founding the nonprofit organization, Carlson and Roginsky stated their goal was to work with both business and government leaders in order to remove NDAs and similar legal agreements from workplaces in instances of assault, harassment and discrimination. They remain subjected to NDAs preventing them from speaking publicly about their experiences and have committed to eradicating NDAs for issues of workplace abuse.

In July 2021, Carlson joined U.S. Senators Kirsten Gillibrand and Lindsey Graham, and Rep. Cheri Bustos, when the lawmakers introduced the bipartisan federal Ending Forced Arbitration of Sexual Assault and Sexual Harassment Act of 2021. The bill was proposed in order to end mandatory arbitration of such claims in the workplace from being required in employment contracts. It was passed in Congress with bipartisan support on February 10, 2022, with Carlson present on Capitol Hill. On March 3, 2022, it was signed into law by President Joe Biden with Carlson as the guest of honor and Roginsky in attendance. Lift Our Voices' co-founders Roginsky and Carlson in an interview with the National Press Club have called the bill a “model” for addressing workplace abuse allegations. The organization's effort was credited with helping Congress dismantle some of the "workplace roadblocks" that helped bring about the MeToo movement. In February 2023, Lift Our Voices launched Know Your Rights, an initiative aimed at providing resources and information for those in the workforce about the law's protections for employees. 

In June 2022, Carlson and Roginsky joined Representatives Lois Frankel, Cheri Bustos, and Ken Buck, who as co-sponsors introduced the bipartisan federal Speak Out Act in House of Representatives, which would prohibit NDAs from being required as part of employment contracts to prevent employees from openly sharing allegations of sexual assault or harassment in the workplace; its lead Senate co-sponsors include Senators Gillibrand, Graham, Marsha Blackburn and Mazie Hirono. Lift Our Voices was called a "pro-worker policy group " that earlier in 2022 "ushered a similar bill into law, nullifying mandatory arbitration provisions for workers alleging #MeToo claims" and noting bipartisan support of both efforts in both chambers of Congress. If passed, Lift Our Voices intends to work to promote awareness for employees so that they understand their right to speak out about sexual misconduct in their workplaces, and its founders have stated that they intend to continue to advocate for changes to the law and corporate policies until "arbitration and NDAs are eliminated for all toxic workplace issues." The bill was signed into law by President Biden on December 7, 2022.

References 

Sexual harassment in the United States
Organizations established in 2019